Climax, is an unincorporated community  in Rockcastle County, Kentucky, United States. It is located on Kentucky Route 1912 north of Orlando. Climax has been noted for its unusual place name.

References

Unincorporated communities in Rockcastle County, Kentucky
Unincorporated communities in Kentucky